Thomas Connor was an Irish Anglican priest, ordained on 23 December 1668 he was Archdeacon of Ardfert from 1693 until 1704.

References

17th-century Irish Anglican priests
18th-century Irish Anglican priests
Archdeacons of Ardfert
Diocese of Limerick, Ardfert and Aghadoe